The Sikorsky CH-124 Sea King (formerly CHSS-2) is a twin-engined anti-submarine warfare (ASW) helicopter designed for shipboard use by Canadian naval forces, based on the US Navy's SH-3 Sea King. Most CH-124s were assembled in Quebec by United Aircraft of Canada. The CH-124 served with the Royal Canadian Navy (RCN) and Canadian Armed Forces from 1963 to 2018.

Design and development
The advent of nuclear-powered submarines in the late 1950s let to the RCN assessing this new threat. There were doubts that destroyers could effectively pursue and destroy such fast vessels, even when operating in pairs. During a 25 February 1959 Naval Board meeting, it was decided to counter the threat by operating helicopters from destroyers. A larger temporary platform was fitted on the destroyer escort ; operational trials used an RCAF Sikorsky S-58, a much larger and heavier aircraft than the HO4S; these successful tests met with approval.

The RCN's then current HO4S-3 utility helicopter could not operate safely in inclement weather with a heavy weapons and sensor load, which would be imperative for the ASW role; hence, a more capable aircraft was needed. Initial 1959 studies identified two helicopters that seemed suitable—the Sikorsky S-61 (HSS-2) and the Kaman K-20 (HU2K)—but neither aircraft had flown at the time, so no choice was made. After further studies concluded that the smaller Kaman would better satisfy RCN requirements, the Treasury Board approved an initial procurement of 12 HU2K helicopters for $14.5 million in December 1960.

Despite this apparent setback for Sikorsky, several factors derailed Kaman's proposal. When the Naval Board held a follow-up meeting on 27 January 1961, it was revealed that the initial 12 units' asking price had nearly doubled to $23 million, only six weeks after approval from the Treasury Board. The Naval Board still endorsed the HU2K, but there were some misgivings over the sharp price increase and reports that Kaman's performance projections may be overly optimistic. The Naval Board decided to await upcoming USN sea trials of the HU2K ahead of a final decision. These trials confirmed the calculations of RCN staff members; the HU2K was substantially heavier than promised, hampering performance and rendering it incapable of meeting RCN requirements, even using a proposed upgraded engine. The Sea King was ultimately chosen for production on 20 December 1961.

The first of 41 helicopters would be delivered in 1963 carrying the designation CHSS-2 Sea King. Airframe components were made by Sikorsky in Connecticut but most CHSS-2s were assembled in Longueuil, Quebec, by United Aircraft of Canada (now Pratt & Whitney Canada), a subsidiary of Sikorsky's parent company, United Aircraft. On 27 November 1963, the new landing platform aboard  was used for the first operational destroyer landing of a production CHSS-2. Upon the unification of Canada's military in 1968, the CHSS-2 was re-designated CH-124.

In the 1960s, the RCN developed a technique for landing large helicopters on small ship decks, using a 'hauldown' winch (called a "Beartrap"), earning aircrews the nickname of "Crazy Canucks".  The Beartrap allows recovery of the Sea King in virtually any sea state. In 1968, the RCN, Royal Canadian Air Force (RCAF) and Canadian Army unified to form the Canadian Forces; air units were dispersed throughout the new force structure until Air Command (AIRCOM) was created in 1975. In August 2011, the Canadian Forces reverted to the former structure of the Royal Canadian Navy, Canadian Army and Royal Canadian Air Force.

Operational service

The Sea Kings were assigned to the former  destroyers (2 per ship with total of 6), s (1 per ship with total of 12), and the former  replenishment ships (3 per ship with total 6) as a means of extending the surveillance capabilities beyond the horizon. When deployed, each Sea King is accompanied by several crews. Each crew consists of two pilots, a Tactical Coordinator (TACCO), and an Airborne Electronic Sensor Operator (AESOp).

In order to find submarines, the Sea King's sonar uses a transducer ball at the end of a 450-foot cable. It can also be fitted with FLIR to find surface vessels at night.

The CH-124 has undergone numerous refits and upgrades, especially with regard to the electronics, main gearboxes and engines, surface-search radar, secure cargo and passenger carrying capabilities.

In 2013 the CH-124 fleet averaged 9–14,000 flying hours, while Sea Kings of other fleets go as high as 40,000 hours. Although the CH-124 had frequent technical issues, none are serious, and they could maintain an 87 percent serviceability rate.

On 1 December 2018, the CH-124 was officially retired in a ceremony at Vancouver Island, British Columbia, concluding 55 years of service. Of the surviving 28 Canadian Sea Kings, nine are destined for museums or to be displayed as monuments, 15 are to be sold, three scrapped, and one retained as a training aid.

Replacement

From 1983 onward attempts were made to replace the aging Sea King helicopters. Due to a series of financial and political issues, the process was hampered by repeated delays. In the end the CH-148 Cyclone, a new variant of the Sikorsky H-92 Superhawk was selected.

Variants

CH-124  Anti-submarine warfare helicopter for the Royal Canadian Navy (41 assembled by United Aircraft of Canada).
CH-124A  The Sea King Improvement Program (SKIP) added modernized avionics as well as improved safety features.
CH-124B  Alternate version of the CH-124A without a dipping sonar but formerly with a MAD sensor and additional storage for deployable stores. In 2006, the five aircraft of this variant were converted to support the Standing Contingency Task Force (SCTF), and were modified with additional troop seats, and frequency agile radios. Plans to add fast-rope capability, EAPSNIPS (Engine Air Particle Separator / Snow & Ice Particle Separator) did not come to fruition.
CH-124B2  Six CH-124Bs were upgraded to the CH-124B2 standard in 1991–1992. The revised CH-124B2 retained the sonobuoy processing gear to passively detect submarines but, the aircraft was now also fitted with a towed-array sonar to supplement the ship's sonar. Since anti-submarine warfare is no longer a major priority within the Canadian Forces, the CH-124B2 were refitted again to become improvised troop carriers for the newly formed Standing Contingency Task Force.
CH-124C  One CH-124 operated by the Helicopter Operational Test and Evaluation Facility located at CFB Shearwater. Used for testing new gear, and when not testing new gear, it is deployable to any Canadian Forces ship requiring a helicopter.
CH-124U  Unofficial designation for four CH-124s that were modified for passenger/freight transport. One crashed in 1973, and the survivors were later refitted to become CH-124As.

Former operators
NOTE: Last aircraft was retired in December 2018

 Royal Canadian Navy
 Royal Canadian Air Force
 443 Maritime Helicopter Squadron
 406 Maritime Operational Training Squadron
 423 Maritime Helicopter Squadron

Specifications (CH-124 Sea King)

Replicas

The Artificial Reef Society of British Columbia is commissioning a full-sized model of the CH-124 to be submerged with the destroyer HMCS Annapolis.

See also

 Water bird emergency landing

References

Notes

Bibliography

External links

 Canadian Forces official CH-124 Sea King website
 The Sea King Timeline, CBC News, July 31, 2013

United States military helicopters
1960s United States helicopters
H-124
Twin-turbine helicopters
Anti-submarine helicopters